Phola may refer to:
Ogies, South Africa
Phola, Mpumalanga, South Africa
Phola (Aetolia), Greece
Phola language, a dialect cluster of the Loloish languages spoken by the Phula people of China
Phola (album), an album by Hugh Masekela
Phola (beetle), a genus of leaf beetles